Mirza Huseyn Afandi Qayibov - Azerbaijani clergyman, literary critic, publicist, enlightener and Mufti of the Caucasus (1884-1917). He was the author of 4-volume work on Azerbaijani literature.

Early life 
Mirza Huseyn was born in 1830, Ashaga-Salakhly village to a clerical family. His father Molla Yusuf was the village mullah. However, he was orphaned at an early age and grew up under the care of his uncle Ibrahim, a village mullah. Having received his primary education from teacher Mohammad Musazadeh, Huseyn was well versed in religious sciences, Arabic, Persian and Turkish, as well as Eastern literature and history. After graduating, he worked as teacher from 1847 to 1857 in his native village.

Career 
He was employed by Mufti of Caucasus, Mahammad Afandi (1857-1872) on July 25, 1857 at the three-year Muslim clerical school in Tbilisi. In February 1858, he began teaching Sharia and Oriental languages here. He befriended Akhundzadeh and Chavchavadze who were the prominent intellectuals of Caucasus living in Tbilisi during this period. He rose to the rank of Governorate Secretary with seniority from January 31 of 1864 with 1858 ruble wage. He was sent to Erzurum at the disposal of the commander of the active corps in to perform as Turkish language translator on February 16, 1878.

He was later transferred to the Transcaucasian Teachers Seminary in 1879. As the first teacher of Arabic and Persian at the seminary, he opened a school for the poor in Tbilisi at his own expense, and later, in the early 20th century, expanded it to become a six-grade "Mufti-Islamic School". He awarded scholarships to 43 Azerbaijanis during his career until 1883. He was relieved of teaching at the end of 1883 and appointed Mufti of Caucasus, a position he held until March 1917. 

He died on 20 February 1917. After his death, the Spiritual Administration of the Caucasus lost its function due to the collapse of the imperial system. According to Aliagha Shikhlinski, he was "completely free from nationalist prejudices. Loving his people, he did not harbor any hostility towards other nations. As a believing Muslim, he knew how to respect someone else's religion, had friends among the Russian, Georgian and Armenian clergy."

Works 
Qayibov was also known as the author of several articles and books. He prepared textbooks on mathematics "Masaili-ammil-hesab" (General issues of arithmetic) and linguistic work "Mabdei-talimi-sibyan" (Beginning for teenagers) for newcomers to the Muslim madrasa. He wrote a 9-part book "Tövsiyyətnamə" (Recommendations), in which he collected many proverbs, riddles and words of wisdom. 

He also collaborated with Adolf Berge on his 4 volume work on Azerbaijani literature. The book contains examples from the works of 109 Azerbaijani poets who lived in the 18th and 19th centuries. The book was published in 1868, Leipzig. Other works by Qayibov include:

 “Zübtədül-Əhkamuş-şəriyyə” (Selected Verdicts on Shariah) 
 “Nümuneyi-ləhceyi-Azərbaycan” (Examples of Azerbaijani dialects) 
 “Müqəddəs tarix və sərfnəhv” (Sacred history)

Family 
Mirza Huseyn was married to Saadat Khanum, daughter of his kinsman Abdulkarim Qayibov with whom he had many issues:

 Nadir bey Qayibov (25 September 1874 - 6 January 1941) — married Khadija Gayibova
 Bahadir bey Qayibov (22 October 1878 - 1949) — married Varvara Minayevna
 Nigar Shikhlinskaya (1878-1931) — the first Azerbaijani nurse, married Dervish-bek Palavandov, then Aliagha Shikhlinski
 Jahangir bey Qayibov (9 March 1882 - 1938) — married Ziba khanum Qajar (20 June 1889 - 1964), daughter of Amir Kazim Mirza Qajar
 Gowhar Usubova (8 May 1885 - ?) — married Ibrahim aga Usubov in 1910
 Nigar Usubova

Awards 

 Order of St. Anna - 1st (15 January 1909), 2nd and 3rd classes
 Order of St. Stanislaus for non-Christians - 1st (27 June 1896), 2nd (25 December 1875) and 3rd classes (5 January 1868)
 Order of St. Vladimir - 3rd (1 January 1887) and 4th degrees (1 January 1883)
 Medal "In memory of the Russian-Turkish war of 1877-1878"
 Medal of the Red Cross (1878)
 Medal "In Commemoration of the Coronation of Emperor Alexander III" (1883)
 Silver Medal Medal "In Commemoration of the Coronation of Emperor Nicholas II" (1896)
 Dark bronze medal for works on the general population census of 1897
 Immaculate Service Insignia (22 August 1898)
 Order of the Lion and the Sun, 2nd degree with a star (18 May 1900)

See also 
 Arif Tabrizi

References

External links 

Azerbaijani-language writers
20th-century Persian-language writers
Writers from the Russian Empire
1830 births
1917 deaths
People from Qazax
Recipients of the Order of St. Anna, 1st class
Recipients of the Order of St. Anna, 2nd class
Recipients of the Order of St. Anna, 3rd class
Recipients of the Order of Saint Stanislaus (Russian), 1st class
Recipients of the Order of Saint Stanislaus (Russian), 2nd class
Recipients of the Order of Saint Stanislaus (Russian), 3rd class
Recipients of the Order of St. Vladimir, 4th class
Recipients of the Order of St. Vladimir, 3rd class
19th-century Persian-language writers
Muftis of the Religious Council of the Caucasus